Dianne DeNecochea (née Shoemaker; born November 16, 1967) is a professional beach volleyball player from the United States who plays on the AVP Tour.  DeNocochea played volleyball at the University of Tennessee and was inducted into the Lady Volunteer Hall of Fame in 2007.  DeNocochea began playing on the AVP Tour full-time in 2001.  She has also played professional indoor volleyball in Switzerland, Belgium, and Italy.

References

External links
 

1967 births
Living people
American women's volleyball players
American women's beach volleyball players
Expatriate volleyball players in Switzerland
Expatriate volleyball players in Belgium
Expatriate volleyball players in Italy
American expatriate sportspeople in Switzerland
American expatriate sportspeople in Belgium
American expatriate sportspeople in Italy
21st-century American women
Tennessee Volunteers women's volleyball players